Mikheil Iadze Stadium is a multi-use stadium in Akhaltsikhe, Georgia.  It is used mostly for football matches and is the home stadium of FC Meskheti Akhaltsikhe. The stadium is able to hold 3,000 people.

See also 
FC Meskheti Akhaltsikhe
Stadiums in Georgia

References

Sports venues in Georgia (country)
Football venues in Georgia (country)
Buildings and structures in Samtskhe–Javakheti